The Broomhill Bridge is a wooden bridge over the River Spey.

History
It was built by engineer John Mackenzie and contractor Charles Mackay, to replace a bridge that had been washed away.

A plaque on the bridge states that the bridge was erected by the "Third, or Badenoch, District Committee of the Inverness-shire County Council," and that the last nail was driven by the Countess Dowager of Seafield on 27 November 1894.

The bridge had to be partially rebuilt in 1987, when some trusses were replaced. The Broomhill Bridge is of the same design as a bridge opened in 1899 at Boat of Garten, but this bridge has since been replaced.

Design
The bridge has 15 wooden spans supported by trestle piers, and the five spans in the main river channel have triangular reinforcing trusses. Each trestle consists of five posts, one vertical and two to each side of it at an angle. Up to half-way up the pier it is reinforced by solid horizontal planking, and above that by diagonal beams on each side of the pier. The five beams which support the roadway sit on a round-ended beam on top of each pier. The abutments are granite, and the piers have metal plates on their upstream faces to protect against debris.

It carries an unclassified public road known as Station Road.

References

Category A listed buildings in Highland (council area)
Wooden bridges in the United Kingdom
Listed bridges in Scotland
Bridges in Highland (council area)
Bridges completed in 1894
1894 establishments in Scotland